Sant'Agostino is a Roman Catholic church located in Massa Marittima, region of Tuscany, Italy. The church has Gothic and Renaissance architecture elements in the apse (1350) and choir (1520) respectively.

The church with stone facade was begun in 1299 for the Augustinian order, but the apse was completed by 1350 in a gothic style with tall narrow windows. The interior has a Sant'Guglielmo by Antonio Nasini, an Annunciation (1640) by Jacopo da Empoli and a Madonna, Child, and Saints and Annunciation (1639) by Rutilio Manetti. The church once housed for some years a Maestà by Ambrogio Lorenzetti, originally made for the nearby Oratory of San Pietro all'Orto, and now held in the city gallery.

References

Churches in the province of Grosseto
Agostino
Agostino
Churches completed in 1350
14th-century Roman Catholic church buildings in Italy
Massa Marittima